is a 1965 Japanese action film directed by Isamu Kosugi. It stars Joe Shishido and Tetsuya Watari. Tetsuya Watari made his acting debut in the film, playing the role of Joe's younger brother.

Joe participates in a European auto races, earns a lot of money and returns to Japan.

Cast
 Joe Shishido as Joe
 Tetsuya Watari as Tetsuya
 Yaeko Mizutani as Nancy
 Chieko Matsubara as Yukari 
 Jūkei Fujioka as Shimizu
 Yuji Odaka as Tsugawa
 Hiroshi Nihonyanaga as Shu
 Jun Hongo as Mike
 Keisuke Yukioka as Ishiguro
 Eiji Gō as Matsuoka

Award
 Elan d'or Award for Newcomer of the Year : Tetsuya Watari

References

External links
Abare Kishidō at Nikkatsu

1965 films
Nikkatsu films
Japanese crime films
1960s Japanese-language films
1960s Japanese films